Peter G. Bourne (born 6 August 1939 in Oxford, England) is a physician, anthropologist, author and international civil servant with experience in several senior government positions. He is currently a visiting senior research fellow at Green Templeton College, Oxford, vice-chancellor emeritus at St. George's University in Grenada and chair of the Medical Education Cooperation with Cuba (MEDICC). He is also a distinguished fellow of the Rothermere American Institute at the University of Oxford.

Background
Bourne was born on 6 August 1939 in Oxford, England. He received his early education at the Dragon School before attending Whitgift School, Croydon. Following a year of undergraduate studies (1957–1958) at Emory University in Atlanta, Georgia, Bourne was admitted to the university's School of Medicine, where he received his M.D. degree in 1962. He later received an M.A. in anthropology from Stanford University in 1969.

Career

Early career
After graduating from medical school, he spent a year (1962–1963) as a fellow in Emory University's psychiatry department studying arrested alcoholics in the city jail in Atlanta. He established a groundbreaking program through which arrested alcoholics could take the drug antabuse as an alternative to serving prison time. He was active in the civil rights movement and participated in the effort to integrate lunch counters in the city. For the next year, he was a rotating intern at King County Hospital in Seattle.

In 1964, Bourne was commissioned as a captain in the United States Army Medical Corps. He was assigned to the Walter Reed Army Institute of Research (WRAIR), where he studied the psychological and physiological effects of stress on basic trainees as a research psychiatrist. He spent one year (1965–1966) in Vietnam as chief of the neuropsychiatry section of the Army's Psychiatric Research Team, where he studied stress in helicopter ambulance medics and Special Forces. These were considered landmark studies in the field of psychoimmunology. During his service, he was awarded the Bronze Star Medal, the Air Medal and the Combat Medics Badge.

Upon discharge from the Army, he was active in the anti-war movement and completed a residency (1967–1969) in psychiatry at Stanford University while concurrently pursuing graduate studies in anthropology. Bourne also worked as a volunteer at the Haight-Ashbury Free Clinic during this period.

In 1969, Bourne returned to Emory University as an assistant professor of psychiatry, preventive medicine and community health. He ran the mental health department of a federally-funded Community Health Center which he eventually expanded into the first free-standing community mental health center in Georgia. He also continued to play an active role in the integration efforts in Georgia and the South. Together with his first wife, Judith Rooks, Bourne led an effort to overturn Georgia's restrictive abortion laws. Having failed in the state legislature, together with other plaintiffs, they filed suit against the state on behalf of Jane Doe, a patient seeking an abortion for whom Bourne was the physician of record. Following victories for the plaintiffs in the state courts the case, as Doe vs Bolton, was appealed to the Supreme Court of the US. It was heard together with the better known case from Texas, Roe vs Wade. The court's watershed ruling based on the two cases transformed women's access to abortion in the US. He was active with the American Psychiatric Association (APA), chairing the organization's Task Force on Drugs and Drug Abuse Education and serving on the Task Force on the Treatment of Psychiatric Disorders. He has served on the editorial board of the journal Psychiatry since 1969. In 2008 he was made a Distinguished Life Fellow of the APA. In 1972 he was named one of "The Five Outstanding Young Men in Georgia."

Bourne had run, as part of his mental health center, a treatment program for heroin addicts. In 1971, Bourne established Georgia's first statewide drug treatment program under Governor Jimmy Carter; from 1970 to 1973, he also served as Carter's special advisor for health affairs. He remained personally close to Carter and was influential in convincing him to run for the American presidency. Bourne would later become a key strategist and deputy campaign director for Carter, running the Washington office for the successful 1976 presidential campaign from 1975 to 1977.

As a result of setting up and successfully running Georgia's first statewide drug treatment program, Bourne left Emory in 1973 to take a position as assistant director in charge of treatment programs in President Richard Nixon's Special Action Office of Drug Abuse Prevention (SAODAP). He did so with the intention of resigning as soon as Carter announced his plans to run for the presidency. Upon leaving the administration in 1974, he served as president of the Foundation for International Resources and a fellow at the Drug Abuse Council through 1976. From 1974 to 1979, he was also a lecturer in psychiatry at Harvard Medical School with a clinical appointment at McLean Hospital in Boston, Massachusetts. Throughout this frenetic period, he also held consultancies with the World Health Organization and the UN Commission on Narcotic Drugs.

US Drug Czar (1977–1978)
Under Jimmy Carter, Bourne was appointed special assistant to the president for health issues and director of the Office of Drug Abuse Policy (ODAP), the predecessor of the current Office of National Drug Control Policy. He resigned this position on 20 July 1978, amid controversy concerning his efforts to maintain the confidentiality of one of his staff for whom he had written a prescription for methaqualone. Shortly thereafter, National Organization for the Reform of Marijuana Laws executive director Keith Stroup leaked Bourne's alleged use of cannabis and cocaine (which Bourne had previously characterized as being "acutely pleasurable" in "The Great Cocaine Myth," a 1974 article for the Drugs and Drug Abuse Education Newsletter) at a party coinciding with the group's annual convention to journalists Gary Cohn and Jack Anderson in retaliation for the Carter administration's continued use of paraquat on Mexican cannabis fields. Bourne denied the allegation.

Under his leadership, however, the number of deaths from drug overdoses dropped to its lowest level in 30 years. Bourne served as the personal envoy of the president of the United States in bilateral discussions with heads of state or government in Burma, Colombia, Thailand, the Philippines and Jamaica. He chaired the World Hunger Working Group, a sub-cabinet committee formed to formulate new US policy with regard to world hunger. This led to the establishment of the Presidential Commission on World Hunger and Malnutrition. He also chaired the Interagency Committee on World Health formed to review the US role in global health and to formulate new presidential initiatives in this area. He was the White House coordinator for the Presidential Commission on the UN International Year of the Child, and with Rosalynn Carter established a Commission on Mental Health and Mental Illness. Bourne also served on the President's Commission on White House Fellows.

Bourne also served as the White House coordinator for International Human Needs (health, literacy, housing, family planning and disaster relief) and the liaison with the UN specialized. In that capacity he was a member of the US delegation to the executive committee of UNICEF, Manila (1977), a member of the US delegation to the World Health Assembly, Geneva 1977,1978, a member of the US delegation to the UN Commission on Narcotic Drugs, Geneva 1977, 1978, and chairman of the US Delegation to the Governing Council of UN Development Programme (UNDP), Geneva, 1978.

United Nations (1979–1982)
In 1979, Bourne became an Assistant Secretary-General at the United Nations, where he established and ran the "International Drinking Water and Sanitation Decade," a 10-year program that would provide clean drinking water to more than 500 million people worldwide. As part of the program Bourne launched, in collaboration with the Centers for Disease Control and Prevention, a global campaign to eradicate the water borne disease caused by guinea worm. Eventually, he convinced Carter to become the public face of the campaign, which is now nearing complete success.

1982 – 1998
After leaving the UN in 1982 for the private sector, Bourne established an NGO, Global Water, to pursue the same goals as the UN program. He began serving on the boards of numerous charities including Save the Children, The Hunger Project (chairman of the board, 1998–2009), Health and Development International, International Health Society, Student Partnerships Worldwide (SPW), the American Association for World Health (chairman of the board), American Public Health Association, The Institute for Human Virology (IHV), Royal Society of Medicine (fellow), the Center for Genetics Nutrition and Health and the Jefferson Awards for Public Service. Bourne also served on the Jury of the prestigious medical prize, The Lasker Awards. He also became president of Tropica Development Ltd, a company involved in fostering economic programs in Africa.

Building on a long-standing interest in the Cuban health care system and relationships established during several visits to the country when in the White House and at the UN, Bourne published in 1986 a well received biography of Fidel Castro. In 1995 as chairman of the American Association for World Health he directed a year-long foundation-supported study of the impact of the US embargo on health and nutrition in CubaDenial of Food and Medicine: The Impact of the US Embargo on Health and Nutrition in Cuba. He co-authored the subsequent report. The study, translated into six languages, drew worldwide attention and lead to the establishment of the NGO, Medical Education Cooperation with Cuba (MEDICC). Its initial objective was to enable senior US medical students to spend six-week electives with family doctors in Cuba. Over five years more than 1,500 students from virtually every medical school in the U.S. took advantage of this program. In 2004 Federal regulations with regard to Cuba were changed making impossible to continue this student program. MEDICC then focussed on the production of a movie on the Cuban health system, the publication of a peer-reviewed, English language journal on Cuban health and medicine and the recruitment of delegations of high level health policy makers to visit Cuba.

As an informal foreign policy advisor to Bill Richardson, Bourne accompanied the legislator to Baghdad in 1995 for a meeting he had negotiated with Saddam Hussein to secure the release of two American aerospace workers who had been captured by the Iraqis after wandering over the Kuwait border. Richardson and Bourne subsequently collaborated on a number of such efforts in Iran, Peru, Cuba, Bangladesh, the United Arab Emirates, Kenya, and North Korea, where they helped win the release of an American lay preacher who had crossed to the wrong side of the border.

Vice-Chancellor, St. George's University, Grenada (1998–2003)
Beginning in 1980, Bourne had been, on a part-time basis, chairman of the Department of Psychiatry at St. George's University Medical School in Grenada; in this capacity, he oversaw the placement and supervision of medical students in psychiatric teaching hospitals in the US and the UK. In 1998, he moved to Grenada and became Vice Chancellor of St. George's University. Over the next five years he built and enhanced the reputation of the medical school, established a school of veterinary medicine, grew the embryonic school of arts and sciences into the second largest institution in the region for students of Caribbean origin, opened a program in public health granting an MPH degree, and started a department of marine biology. He also launched on campus, in collaboration with the West Indies Cricket Board, The Shell Cricket as the main training institution for the West Indies cricket team. It gave the university, for the first time, recognition and acceptance throughout the English-speaking Caribbean.

Later career
In 2003 Bourne left Grenada and returned to Washington, D.C. He was appointed as a visiting senior research fellow at Green Templeton College at the University of Oxford and began dividing his time between the US and the UK. This included increasing the time he spent at his farm in Wales, where he raised red deer, llamas and North American bison. In 2012 he was made a visiting distinguished fellow at the Rothermere American Institute of Oxford University. At Green Templeton College he was on the steering committee of the annual Emerging Markets Symposium.

Bourne is a member of the Reform Club (London), the Special Forces Club (London), and a Fellow of the Royal Society of Medicine. A recreational runner he was, in 1993, nationally ranked in the marathon for his age group (age 44yrs) after completing the Marine Corps marathon in 2 hours, 45 min, 14 secs. At age 73 years he came in first in the over-70 category in the Oxford Half-Marathon. He also has a private pilot's license.

Books
 Fidel – a biography of Fidel Castro, Dodd, Mead and Company, 1986
 Jimmy Carter: a comprehensive biography from Plains to postpresidency, Charles Scribner's Sons, 1997

References

External links
   www.petergbourne.co.uk
 

1939 births
Living people
People from Oxford
People educated at The Dragon School
People educated at Whitgift School
Emory University School of Medicine alumni
Stanford University alumni
American anthropologists
American biographers
American male biographers
American civil servants
United States Army officers
Recipients of the Air Medal